Heinrich Werner may refer to:
Heinrich Werner (physician) (1874–1946), German parasitologist
 Heinrich Werner (composer) (1800–1833), composer